This is a list of notable events in music that took place in the year 1972.


Specific locations
1972 in British music
1972 in Norwegian music

Specific genres
1972 in country music
1972 in heavy metal music
1972 in jazz

Events
January 17 – 12 miles of U.S. Highway 51 in Memphis, Tennessee from South Parkway East to the Tennessee/Mississippi state line is renamed "Elvis Presley Boulevard."
January 20 – The debut of Pink Floyd's Dark Side of the Moon at The Dome, Brighton, is halted by technical difficulties. Dark Side of the Moon would be played in its entirety the following night, but it would be a full year before the album was released.
January 21 – Keith Richards jumps on stage to jam with Chuck Berry at the Hollywood Palladium, but is ordered off for playing too loud. Berry later claims that he did not recognize Keith and would not have booted him if he did.
January 29–31 – The first Sunbury Music Festival is held in Sunbury, Victoria. Performers include Billy Thorpe & The Aztecs, Wendy Saddington, Chain and The La De Das.
January 31 – Over 40,000 mourners file past Mahalia Jackson's open casket to pay their respects in Chicago's Great Salem Baptist Church.
February 9 – Paul McCartney's new band, Wings, make their live debut at the University of Nottingham in England. It's McCartney's first public concert since The Beatles' 1966 US tour.
February 10 – David Bowie opens the Ziggy Stardust tour at The Toby Jug pub, Tolworth, Surrey.
February 13 – Led Zeppelin's concert in Singapore is canceled when government officials will not let them off the airplane because of their long hair.
February 14–18 – John Lennon and Yoko Ono co-host an entire week of The Mike Douglas Show.
February 15 – The United States gives federal copyright protection to sound recordings.  Prior to this, phonograph records were only protected at state level, and not in all states.
February 19
Paul McCartney's single "Give Ireland Back to the Irish" (inspired by the "Bloody Sunday" massacre in Ireland on January 30, 1972) is banned by the BBC. The controversy caused by the banning only increases the song's popularity and it ends up in the Top 20 in England.
Sammy Davis, Jr. makes a guest appearance on the television show All in the Family.
February 23 – Elvis and Priscilla Presley separate.
February 29 – John Lennon's U.S. immigration visa expires, beginning his three-and-a-half-year fight to remain in the country.
March 15
At the 14th Annual Grammy Awards, hosted by Andy Williams, winners include Carole King, Kris Kristofferson, Colin Davis, Michel LeGrand, Isaac Hayes, Julian Bream, Vladimir Horowitz, the Juilliard String Quartet and Bill Withers. King wins Album of the Year (for Tapestry), Record of the Year (for "It's Too Late") and Song of the Year (for ”You've Got a Friend"), while Carly Simon wins Best New Artist.
L.A. disc jockey Robert W. Morgan plays Donny Osmond's "Puppy Love" non-stop for 90 minutes. Police are called, but no arrests are made.
March 21 – Terry Knight announces he is launching a $5 million lawsuit against Grand Funk's new manager John Eastman, one week after being fired as Grand Funk's manager. It triggers a series of suits and counter-suits between Knight and the band throughout the coming months.
March 25 – The 17th Eurovision Song Contest, held in the Usher Hall, Edinburgh, Scotland, is won by German-based Greek singer Vicky Leandros, representing Luxembourg with the song Après Toi. The song is subsequently released around Europe, having been recorded in several languages, including in English as Come What May.
March 31 – Official Beatles fan club closes down.
April 2 – John Lennon and Yoko Ono hold a press conference in New York. The Lennons discuss their appeal against the US Immigration Department's decision to deport John.
April 9 –  First solo concert of Valery Leontiev.
April 16 – Electric Light Orchestra make their live debut at the Fox and Greyhound pub in Park Lane, Croydon, England.
April 29 – New York City mayor John Lindsay announces that he is supporting John Lennon and Yoko Ono in their fight to remain in the United States.
May 2 – Stone the Crows lead guitarist Les Harvey is electrocuted on stage during a show in Swansea, Wales, by touching a poorly connected microphone. Harvey died in a hospital a few hours later. The band's lead singer, Maggie Bell, Harvey's longtime girlfriend, was also hospitalized, having collapsed on stage after the incident.
May 8 – Billy Preston becomes the first rock performer to headline at New York's Radio City Music Hall
May 27 – The Opryland USA country music theme park opens in Nashville, Tennessee.
June – Founding member Roy Wood leaves the Electric Light Orchestra line-up just as the band scores its first hit single.
June 3 – The Rolling Stones open their North American tour in Vancouver, British Columbia, Canada.
June 10 – Elvis Presley does the first of four concerts at the Madison Square Garden in New York City. He sells out all the shows in one day.
June 14 – Simon & Garfunkel reunite briefly to perform live at Madison Square Garden at a campaign benefit for Democratic presidential candidate George McGovern. Other performers include Peter, Paul and Mary and Dionne Warwick.
July 24 – Bobby Ramirez, drummer for Edgar Winter's White Trash, is beaten to death in a Chicago bar fight, reportedly because his hair was too long.
August 5 – Clive Davis signs Aerosmith to Columbia Records at Max's Kansas City in New York City.
August 30 – John Lennon and Yoko Ono headline the "One To One Concert" at Madison Square Garden to benefit mentally handicapped children. Elephant's Memory, Roberta Flack, Stevie Wonder and Sha Na Na also perform.
September 1–7 – Karlheinz Stockhausen directs performances of his works at the Shiraz Arts Festival, including Mantra, Hymnen, an all-day performance of Aus den sieben Tagen, and world premieres of two compositions from Für kommende Zeiten
September 21 – ABC premieres the new TV series In Concert. The first episode features Alice Cooper.
September 29 – Miles Davis unveils his new nine-piece band at the Lincoln Center Philharmonic Hall.
October 12 – Diana Ross makes her acting debut in the successful film Lady Sings the Blues, garnering her first Academy Award nomination for Best Actress.
November 3 – James Taylor and Carly Simon are married in a tiny ceremony in Simon's Manhattan apartment.
November 12 – 51,778 fans pack San Diego Stadium for a concert promoted by KGB-AM to see J. Geils Band, Quicksilver Messenger Service, Foghat and Dr. Hook and the Medicine Show.
November 25 – The 1st OTI Song Contest, held in the Congres and Expositions Palace, Madrid, Spain, is won by singers Tobias and Claudia Regina, representing Brazil with the song Diálogo ("Dialogue").
November 26 – Family, touring North America as the warmup act for Elton John, play their last concert on U.S. soil in St. Petersburg, Florida.
December 23 – Grand Funk Railroad, completing its 1972 Tour, with a sold-out concert at NYC's Madison Square Garden, with the proceeds from the concert benefiting the Phoenix House Drug Rehabilitation Program, and with the show being filmed for ABC-TV's "In Concert" Series, the band is met by a lawsuit taken out by their former manager, Terry Knight, who attempts to block the show from going on, attempting to seize their equipment. Fortunately, a court injunction is given later in the day, allowing the concert to take place.
December 31 – The first New Year's Rockin' Eve, with host Dick Clark, airs on NBC (before moving to ABC) with Three Dog Night as the featured act. Blood, Sweat & Tears, Helen Reddy and Al Green also perform.  
unknown date
Herbert Howells becomes a Companion of Honour.
Billy Ray Hearn founds Myrrh Records.
Joseph Hoo Kim founds Channel One Studios in Kingston, Jamaica.
Numa Labinsky (bass singer) and the brothers Michael and Gerald Reynolds found Nimbus Records, a specialist classical music recording company at Wyastone Leys in Herefordshire, England.
Heisei College of Music is established in Mifune, Kumamoto, Japan.

Bands formed
See Musical groups established in 1972

Bands disbanded
Creedence Clearwater Revival
Jefferson Airplane
Martha and the Vandellas
MC5
Them
The Velvet Underground

Albums released

January

February

March

April

May

June

July

August

September

October

November

December

Release date unknown

360 Degrees of Billy Paul - Billy Paul
Akilah! - Melvin Sparks
Album III – Loudon Wainwright III
All I Ever Need Is You - Sonny & Cher
All the King's Horses - Grover Washington Jr.
All Over You – Chilliwack
All the Young Dudes - Mott the Hoople
All Together Now - Argent
Alone Again (Naturally) – Andy Williams
Already Here – Redbone
Antithesis - Gypsy
The Artistry of Glen Campbell – Glen Campbell
Attica Blues – Archie Shepp
The Award Winning Country Gentlemen - The Country Gentlemen
Azteca - Azteca
Aztec Two-Step – Aztec Two-Step
Baby Won't You Change Your Mind - Black Ivory
Back Door - Back Door
Backroads – Kenny Rogers and the First Edition
Back to Front – Gilbert O'Sullivan
Banco del Mutuo Soccorso – Banco del Mutuo Soccorso
Be Altitude: Respect Yourself – The Staple Singers 
Be Good to Yourself at Least Once a Day - Man
Bitter Sweet - The Main Ingredient
Black Heat - Black Heat
Blacknuss – Rahsaan Roland Kirk
Bloodstone - Bloodstone
Black Widow III – Black Widow
Blue Moses - Randy Weston
Bluesmith - Jimmy Smith
Bob Mosley – Bob Mosley
Bootleg Him – Alexis Korner – Compilation
Boot Power – Mungo Jerry
Bread Winners – Jack Jones
The Bridge in Blue – The Brooklyn Bridge (as The Bridge)
Bugger Off! - Stack Waddy
Bulletproof - Hard Stuff
Bump City - Tower of Power
Carnival in Babylon – Amon Düül II
Changes - Catapilla
Cherry - Stanley Turrentine
Celebration – El Chicano
Climax – Climax
Cluster II – Cluster
Cochran – Wayne Cochran
Coming Together - New Birth
Cosmo - Doug Clifford
Crossings – Herbie Hancock
Cymande - Cymande
Dark Round the Edges – Dark
Dave Clark and Friends – Dave Clark
Dead Forever... - Buffalo
Demolition Derby – Sandy Bull
Demon in Disguise – David Bromberg
Diamonds in the Rough - John Prine
Dig This! - Bobbi Humphrey
Dingly Dell – Lindisfarne
Discover America - Van Dyke Parks
Don't It Drag On - Chris Smither
Double Dubliners – The Dubliners
Drama – Maria Bethânia
Duane & Greg Allman - Duane and Gregg Allman 
Earthspan – Incredible String Band
Electric Shocks – Roger Ruskin Spear
Ella Loves Cole – Ella Fitzgerald 
Emergency Ward – Nina Simone
Ethiopian Knights - Donald Byrd
Everything Stops for Tea - Long John Baldry
Face to Face with the Truth - The Undisputed Truth
Faces – Shawn Phillips
Faro Annie – John Renbourn
Faust So Far – Faust
Fifth - Soft Machine
Filthy! - Papa John Creach
First Base - Babe Ruth
First Taste of Sin – Cold Blood
Fly Dude - Jimmy McGriff
Focus 3 – Focus
Foxy Lady - Cher
Framed – The Sensational Alex Harvey BandFreeway Madness - Pretty ThingsFriendliness - StackridgeGarden in the City – MelanieThe Gentle Giant - Yusef LateefGenya Ravan – Genya RavanGeronimo Black – Geronimo BlackGeronimo's Cadillac - Michael Martin MurpheyGive Tomorrow's Children One More Chance – OceanGoin' Down Slow - Sonny StittGot My Own Bag of Tricks – Bo DiddleyHard Attack - DustHeads – OsibisaThe Heatin' System - Jimmy McGriffHelp Me Make It Through the Night - Hank CrawfordHigh, Low and In Between – Townes van ZandtHogwash – The GroundhogsHome - HomeHome Free – Dan FogelbergHometown! – The Dubliners (live)Honky-Tonk Stardust Cowboy - Jonathan EdwardsHoodoo Man – Birth ControlHot Licks, Cold Steel & Truckers Favorites - Commander Cody and His Lost Planet AirmenHoward Tate – Howard TateHush 'N' Thunder - Yusef LateefI Am – Pete TownshendI Am Woman - Helen ReddyI'll Play the Blues for You - Albert KingIf 4 (a.k.a. Waterfall) – IfI Got Some – Billy GarnerI Gotcha – Joe TexI'll Make You Music – Beverly BremersImagination Lady – Chicken ShackI'm Satisfied – John Paul Hammond Infinite – Kazumi WatanabeIn Search of Amelia Earhart - Plainsong...In Spite of Harry's Toenail - GnidrologInstant Death - Eddie HarrisIntensity - Charles EarlandIt Never Rains in Southern California – Albert HammondIt's Just Begun - Jimmy CastorJackie - Jackie DeShannonJermaine - Jermaine JacksonJo Jo Gunne – Jo Jo GunneJohn David Souther - J.D. SoutherKapt. Kopter and the (Fabulous) Twirly Birds – Randy CaliforniaKeeper of the Castle – Four TopsKongos – John KongosKossoff, Kirke, Tetsu and Rabbit – Kossoff, Kirke, Tetsu and RabbitKraftwerk 2 - KraftwerkLa Población – Víctor JaraLady Lake - GnidrologLark - Linda LewisLast Autumn's Dream – Jade WarriorLast Days and Time - Earth, Wind & FireThe Late Great Townes Van Zandt - Townes Van ZandtLet's Make Up and Be Friendly – Bonzo Dog Doo-Dah BandLet My Children Hear Music – Charles MingusLetters - Jimmy WebbA Little Bit of Paul Davis – Paul DavisLittle Jimmy Osmond – Jimmy OsmondLive – Donny Hathaway – LiveLive in Tokyo – Weather Report – LiveLiving – Judy CollinsThe London Muddy Waters Sessions – Muddy WatersLove Unlimited - Love UnlimitedMark, Don & Mel: 1969–71 – Grand Funk Railroad – CompilationMarlena (Marlena Shaw album) - Marlena ShawMandrill Is – MandrillMatching Mole - Matching MoleMatching Mole's Little Red Record - Matching MoleMaxoom - Mahogany RushMe & Chet - Chet Atkins and Jerry ReedMediterranean Tales - TriumviratA Meeting of the Times – Rahsaan Roland KirkA Message from the People – Ray CharlesMillie Jackson - Millie JacksonMississippi Gambler – Herbie MannMournin' – Night SunMorning Bugle - John HartfordMorning Star - Hubert LawsMove Along - The Grass RootsMustang – The ShadowsMyrrh - Robin WilliamsonNeither One of Us – Gladys Knight & the PipsNeu! – Neu! Never Get Out of These Blues Alive – John Lee HookerNext Album - Sonny RollinsA Night on the Town – Brownsville StationThe Night is Still Young – Sha Na NaNitzinger – John NitzingerO'Keefe - Danny O'KeefeOf Rivers and Religion - John FaheyOffering - Larry CoryellOlympia 71 – Dalida – LiveOntinuous Performance – Stone the CrowsOrange - Al StewartThe Osmonds Live – The Osmonds – LivePainted Head – Tim HardinPhantasmagoria - Curved AirPiano Improvisations Vol. 2 – Chick CoreaPortrait of Donny – Donny OsmondPancho and Lefty – Merle Haggard and Willie Nelson Prologue – RenaissanceProsperous – Christy MooreRatchell II – RatchellRaw Velvet - Bobby WhitlockRecycling The Blues & Other Related Stuff - Taj MahalRed Sea - WarhorseReturn to Forever – Return to ForeverReunion: Live at Madison Square Garden – Dion and the BelmontsRoad - RoadThe Road Is No Place for a Lady - Cass ElliotRock Me Baby – David CassidyRoforofo Fight - Fela KutiSahara - McCoy TynerSanctuary – Dion DiMucciScience Fiction - Ornette ColemanScraps – NRBQScreaming Target – Big YouthSeven Bridges Road - Steve YoungSeventy-Second Brave - Keef HartleyShakara – Fela Kuti Shearwater - Martin CarthySloppy Seconds – Dr. Hook and the Medicine Show Smokestack Lightning – Mike HarrisonSonic Seasonings - Wendy CarlosA Song for You – Jack JonesSort Of – Slapp HappySoul Is... Pretty Purdie - Bernard PurdieSpace Shanty - KhanSpeech - SteamhammerSpring - American SpringStanding Ovation – Gladys Knight & the PipsStardancer - Tom RappStoneground Words – MelanieStratavarious - Ginger BakerSuite for Late Summer – Dion DiMucciSunday Morning Coming Down – Johnny CashThe Sweet Life - Reuben WilsonSweet Revival - Ronnie FosterThe Sylvers - The SylversA Tab in the Ocean – NektarTalk to the People - Les McCannTe John, Grease, & Wolfman - Charlie DanielsTell Me This Is a Dream - The DelfonicsTexas Cannonball - Freddie KingThree – Jackie LomaxThrough the Eyes of Love – Ray CharlesTim Rose – Tim RoseTogether – Jesse Colin YoungToo Young – Donny OsmondThe Train I'm On - Tony Joe WhiteTrouble at Mill – King Earl Boogie BandUnderstanding - Bobby WomackUomo di pezza – Le OrmeVindicator - Arthur LeeWalking the Blues - Otis SpannWe Got a Good Thing Going - Hank CrawfordWe the People - The Soul SearchersWhat a Bunch of Sweeties - Pink FairiesWhatcha See Is Whatcha Get – The DramaticsWho Will Save the World? – The GroundhogsWhere It All Began – Bo Diddley...Where the Groupies Killed the Blues - Lucifer's FriendWhistle Rymes - John EntwistleWhite Rabbit - George BensonWhole Oats - Hall & OatesWild Flower - Hubert LawsWild Horses Rock Steady - Johnny "Hammond" SmithWild One – The Guess WhoWillis Alan Ramsey – Willis Alan RamseyWill the Circle Be Unbroken – Nitty Gritty Dirt BandThe Willie Way - Willie NelsonWolf City – Amon Düül IIWorld Galaxy – Alice ColtraneYou Are the Music...We're Just the Band – TrapezeYou Want It, You Got It – The Detroit EmeraldsZeit - Tangerine Dream

Biggest hit singles
The following songs achieved the highest chart positions
in the charts of 1972.

Top 40 Chart hit singles

Other Chart hit singles
"Apache" – The Shadows (reissue)
"Baby, Don't Get Hooked on Me" – Mac Davis
"Baby Let Me Take You (In My Arms)" – The Detroit Emeralds
"Back Off Boogaloo" – Ringo Starr
"Back Stabbers" – The O'Jays
"Bang a Gong (Get It On)" – T. Rex
"Beautiful Sunday" – Daniel Boone

Notable singles

Other Notable singles
"Hoochie Koochie Lady" b/w "First Avenue" - Elf

Published popular music
 "Alone Again (Naturally)" w.m. Raymond O'Sullivan
 "Alone at a Drive-In Movie"     w.m. Jim Jacobs & Warren Casey
 "American Pie" w.m. Don McLean
 "Bad, Bad Leroy Brown" w.m. Jim Croce
 "Beautiful Through and Through" w. Bob Merrill m. Jule Styne from the musical Sugar "Beauty School Dropout" w.m. Warren Casey & Jim Jacobs from the musical Grease "The Beauty That Drives Men Mad" w. Bob Merrill m. Jule Styne from the musical Sugar "Bein' Green" w.m. Joe Raposo from the television series Sesame Street.
 "Blues for Newport" m. Dave Brubeck
 "Born to Hand Jive" w.m. Warren Casey & Jim Jacobs from the musical Grease "Burning Love"    w.m. Dennis Linde
 "C is for Cookie" w.m. Joe Raposo
 "Clair" w.m. Raymond O'Sullivan
 "Come Dream With Me" w. Sammy Cahn m. Jimmy Van Heusen
 "Corner of the Sky" w.m. Stephen Schwartz from the musical Pippin"For Emily, Whenever I May Find Her" – Simon & Garfunkel
 "Greased Lightning" w.m. Warren Casey & Jim Jacobs from the musical Grease "I Can See Clearly Now" w.m. Johnny Nash
 "Killing Me Softly with His Song" w. Norman Gimbel m. Charles Fox
 "Liza with a Z" w. Fred Ebb m. John Kander from the television production Liza with a Z"Magic To Do" w.m. Stephen Schwartz. Introduced by Ben Vereen in the musical Pippin "Maybe This Time" w. Fred Ebb m. John Kander from the musical film Cabaret "Mooning" w.m. Warren Casey & Jim Jacobs from the musical Grease "The Morning After" w.m. Joel Hirschhorn & Al Kasha from the film The Poseidon Adventure "No Time at All" w.m. Stephen Schwartz from the musical Pippin "The Old Fashioned Way" w. Charles Aznavour, Joel Hirschhorn & Al Kasha m. George Garvarentz
 "Ring Them Bells"     w. Fred Ebb m. John Kander from the television production Liza with a Z"Rock and Roll" – Led Zeppelin
 "Shakin' at the High School Hop"     w.m. Jim Jacobs & Warren Casey
 "Sing" w.m. Joe Raposo. Introduced by Bob McGrath on Sesame Street "Speak Softly, Love"      w. Larry Kusik m. Nino Rota from the film The Godfather "Summer Nights" w.m. Warren Casey & Jim Jacobs from the musical Grease "Taxi (song)" — Harry Chapin
 "There Are Worse Things I Could Do" w.m. Warren Casey & Jim Jacobs from the musical Grease "Tie a Yellow Ribbon Round the Ole Oak Tree" w.m. L. Russell Brown & Irwin Levine
 "Vincent" w.m. Don McLean
 "You Are the Sunshine of My Life" w.m. Stevie Wonder

Other notable songs (world)
"Caro Mozart" – Sylvie Vartan (France)
"Holidays" – Michel Polnareff (France)

Classical music
Arthur Bliss – Metamorphic VariationsFriedrich Cerha – SpiegelGeorge Crumb – Makrokosmos, Volume I for amplified piano
Mario Davidovsky – Transientes for orchestra
Paul Le Flem – Symphony No. 4
Karel GoeyvaertsBélise dans un jardinNachklänge aus dem Theater I–II, for tape
Piano Quartet
Hans Werner Henze – Heliogabalus imperatorKlaus Huber...Ausgespannt..., sacred music for baritone, five instrumental groups, loudspeakers, two two-track tapes, and organEin Hauch von Unzeit I: Plainte sur la perte de la réflexion musicale – quelques madrigaux pour flûte seule ou flûte avec quelques instruments quelquonques...Ein Hauch von Unzeit II: Plainte sur la perte de la réflexion musicale pour piano à une main et demie... , for pianoEin Hauch von Unzeit III, for 2–7 players (variable instrumentation)
Dmitri Kabalevsky – A Letter to the 30th Century (oratorio)
Wojciech Kilar – Prelude and Carol for 4 oboes and strings
György Ligeti – Double Concerto for flute, oboe and orchestra
Theo Loevendie – Horn Concerto, "Orbits"
Yves Prin – Actions-Simultanées II, for orchestra 
Einojuhani RautavaaraCantus Arcticus, for orchestraCanto III – A Portrait of the Artist at a Certain Moment, for string orchestraCredo, for mixed chorusBook of Life (Elämän kirja), choral suite
Steve Reich – Clapping MusicGeorge Rochberg – Recordanza (Soliloquy for Cello and Piano)
Peter Ruzicka – BewegungKarlheinz Stockhausen –Alphabet für Liège, for soloists and duos, Nr. 36Ylem, for variable ensemble of 19 or more players, Nr. 37
Toru Takemitsu – DistanceVeljo Tormis – Curse Upon Iron (Raua needmine)Opera
Peter Maxwell Davies – Taverner (12 July, Covent Garden, London)
Kiyoshige Koyama – Sansho DayuPer Nørgård – Gilgamesh 
Thomas PasatieriBlack WidowThe Trial of Mary LincolnCharles Wilson – Héloise and AbelardJazz

Musical theater
 Berlin to Broadway with Kurt Weill – Off-Broadway revue opened at the Theatre de Lys on October 1 and ran for 152 performances
 Company (Stephen Sondheim) – London production opened at Her Majesty's Theatre on January 18 and ran for 344 performances
 Cowardy Custard – London production opened at the Mermaid Theatre on July 10 and ran for 405 performances
 Don't Bother Me, I Can't Cope – London production opened at the Playhouse Theatre on April 19 and ran for 914 performances
 Don't Play Us Cheap – Broadway production opened at the Ethel Barrymore Theatre on May 16 and ran for 164 performances
 A Funny Thing Happened on the Way to the Forum (Stephen Sondheim) – Broadway revival
 The Good Old, Bad Old Days (Music, Lyrics & Book: Anthony Newley & Leslie Bricusse) London production opened at the Prince of Wales Theatre on December 20 and ran for 309 performances
 Jesus Christ Superstar (Andrew Lloyd Webber and Tim Rice) – London production opened at the Palace Theatre on August 9 and ran for 3358 performances
 Grease – Broadway production ran for 3388 performances, the longest run ever at that time
 Joseph and the Amazing Technicolor Dreamcoat (Lloyd Webber & Rice) – London production opened at The Roundhouse on November 8 and ran for 43 performances
 Man of La Mancha     Broadway revival
 Pippin – Broadway production opened at the Imperial Theatre on October 23 and ran for 1944 performances
 Sugar – Broadway production opened at the Kajestic Theatre and ran for 505 performances

Musical films
 Baharo Phool Barsao Cabaret Fillmore (musical documentary)
 Jawani Diwani Lady Sings the Blues Man of La Mancha Propala Hramota Journey Back to Oz, with music by Walter Scharf, and songs by Jimmy Van Heusen and Sammy Cahn
 Seeta Aur Geeta (music by R. D. Burman)

 Musical television productions 
 Liza with a ZBirths
January 3 – Nichole Nordeman, American singer
January 17 – Aqualung, English songwriter, musician and record producer
January 19 – Angham, Egyptian singer, record producer and actress
January 21 - Cat Power, American singer-songwriter and musician
January 24 - Beth Hart, American singer, songwriter and musician
January 26 – Christopher Boykin, American rapper
January 27
Wynne Evans, Welsh tenor
Mark Owen, British singer (Take That)
Bibi Gaytán, Mexican singer 
February 1 – Tego Calderón, Puerto Rican rapper and singer
February 2 - Zoë Keating, Canadian-American cellist and composer
February 11 – Craig Jones, American heavy metal sampler/keyboardist (Slipknot)
February 14 – Rob Thomas, American singer-songwriter, musician, multi instrumentalist and advocate (Matchbox Twenty)
February 16 – Taylor Hawkins, American rock drummer (Foo Fighters) (d. 2022)
February 17
Billie Joe Armstrong, American rock musician, playwright, activist, advocate, actor and singer-songwriter (Green Day)
Taylor Hawkins, American drumme (Foo Fighters)
Yuki Isoya, Japanese singer
February 20 – K-os, Canadian alternative rapper, singer-songwriter and record producer
February 24
Teodor Currentzis, Greek orchestral conductor
March 4 
Alison Wheeler, British singer (The Beautiful South)
Ivy Queen, Puerto Rican singer, rapper and songwriter
March 6 – Jaret Reddick, American musician (Bowling for Soup)
March 8 – Angie Hart, Australian pop singer
March 9 – AZ, American rapper
March 10 – Timbaland, American record producer, rapper, singer-songwriter and DJ (Ginuwine, Aaliyah, Justin Timberlake)
March 11 – UA, Japanese singer-songwriter
April 4 - Jill Scott, American soul singer and songwriter 
April 12 – Şebnem Ferah, Turkish singer-songwriter
March 13 – Common, American rapper and actor
March 15 – Mark Hoppus, American rock musician (blink-182)
March 17 – Melissa Auf der Maur (Hole)
March 20 – Alexander Kapranos, British rock singer and guitarist (Franz Ferdinand)
April 1 – Sukshinder Shinda, British bhangra singer-songwriter and record producer
April 8 – Paul Gray, American heavy metal bass guitarist (Slipknot)
April 10 – Sami Yli-Sirniö, Finnish rock and metal guitarist
April 12 – Şebnem Ferah, Turkish singer-songwriter
April 13 – Aaron Lewis, American nu metal musician (Staind)
April 20 
 Željko Joksimović, Serbian singer, composer songwriter, multi-instrumentalist and producer
 Marko Kon, Serbian composer, producer and singer
 Stephen Marley, Jamaican-American musician
April 23 – Amira Medunjanin, singer from Bosnia and Herzegovina
April 24 – Corey Cerovsek, Canadian violinist and pianist
April 28 – Violent J, American rapper
April 29 – Fredrik Kempe, Swedish songwriter and opera and pop singer
May 3 – Mark Morrison, British R&B singer 
May 4
Mike Dirnt American musician, songwriter and composer. (Green Day)
Chris Tomlin, American contemporary Christian musician (CCM)
May 7 – Felix da Housecat, American house music DJ and record producer
May 14 – Salaam Remi, American record producer
May 19 – Jenny Berggren, Swedish singer (Ace of Base)
May 20 – Busta Rhymes, American hip hop recording artist, actor, record producer and record executive
May 21
 The Notorious B.I.G., American rapper (d. 1997)
 Mitch Allen, American record producer, songwriter and musician.
May 26 – Ahmad Dhani, Indonesian rock musician, songwriter, arranger, producer and politician
May 27 – Ivete Sangalo, Brazilian female singer
May 29 – Stanislas, French singer
May 31 - Christian McBride, American jazz bassist, composer, artistic director
June 4 – Stoja, Serbian pop-folk singer
June 5 
Paweł Kotla, Polish conductor
Toni Pearen, Australian singer-songwriter, TV host, dancer and actor
June 6 – Cristina Scabbia, Italian singer
June 12 – Bounty Killer, reggae/dancehall singer
June 13 - Natalie MacMaster, Canadian fiddler
June 17 – Rik Rok, Jamaican singer
June 23 – Fredwreck, Palestinian American music artist and record producer
June 25 – Mike Kroeger, Canadian rock bass guitarist (Nickelback)
June 26 – Garou, French Canadian singer
July 1
Sunshine Becker, American backing singer (Furthur)
Alex Machacek, Austrian guitarist (BPM and CAB)
July 4 – Rogue, American dark wave lead singer (The Crüxshadows)
July 10 – Tilo Wolff, German musician
July 12 – Brett Reed, drummer (Rancid)
July 17
Elizabeth Cook, American singer and guitarist
Jason Rullo, American drummer (Symphony X and Redemption)
July 20 – Vitamin C, American singer-songwriter, dancer and actress (Eve's Plum)
July 26 – Wayne Wonder, reggae singer
July 29 – Anssi Kela, Finnish rock musician
August 4 - John Paul White, is an American singer-songwriter, and was a member of the Grammy Award-winning duo The Civil Wars.
August 6 – Geri Halliwell, British singer, clothes designer, author and actress (Spice Girls)
August 8 – Lüpüs Thünder (Bloodhound Gang)
August 9 – A-mei, Taiwanese Puyuma singer-songwriter
August 12
Del tha Funky Homosapien, American hip-hop artist
Demir Demirkan, Turkish rock musician and songwriter
August 15 – Mikey Graham, Irish singer (Boyzone)
August 16 – Emily Robison, American country music performer (Dixie Chicks)
August 18
 Leo Ku, Hong Kong actor and singer 
 Keiko Yamada, Japanese singer (Globe)
August 27 – Jimmy Pop, American musician (Bloodhound Gang)
September 4 – Carlos Ponce, Puerto Rican actor, singer, composer 
September 6 – Idris Elba, English actor, producer, musician and DJ
September 21 – Liam Gallagher, British singer (Oasis)
September 23 – Jermaine Dupri, American rapper, record producer, musician
September 26 – Shawn Stockman, American singer (Boyz II Men)
September 28 
 Dita Von Teese, American vedette, burlesque dancer, model, businesswoman and singer (worked with Sebastien Tellier) 
 Kevin MacLeod, American composer and music producer
September 30 – Shaan, Indian singer
October 3 - G. Love, American musician (G. Love and Special Sauce)
October 10 – Tor Erik Hermansen, American record producer and songwriter of the team Stargate (music producers)
October 17
Eminem, American rapper, producer, record producer, musician, business man (D12 and Soul Intent (group))
Tarkan, Turkish singer
October 6 – Anders Iwers, Swedish heavy metal guitarist
October 19 – Pras (Michél), American rapper, hip hop musician, record producer, songwriter and actor (Fugees)
October 20 – Stephan Moccio, Canadian pianist, composer, producer, arranger and conductor
October 27 – Elissa, Lebanese singer
October 28 – Brad Paisley, American country music performer
November 17 – Kimya Dawson, American singer/songwriter
November 25 – Mark Morton, American heavy metal guitarist (Lamb of God)
November 28 – Jesper Strömblad, Swedish death metal guitarist
December 1 – Greg Upchurch, American rock drummer (Puddle of Mudd, 3 Doors Down)
December 9 – Tré Cool, German-born American musician, drummer and composer (Green Day)
December 10
Scot Alexander, American alternative rock bass guitarist (Dishwalla)
Brian Molko, British rock singer (Placebo)
 Mikkel Storleer Eriksen, American songwriter and producer of the team Stargate (music producers)
December 11 – Easther Bennett, British singer (Eternal)
December 12 – Kevin Parent, Canadian singer-songwriter and actor
December 13 – Niki Evans, English actress and singer
December 15, Jason Nevins, American songwriter, record producer and remixer
December 16 – Ben Kowalewicz, Canadian rock lead singer (Billy Talent)
December 18 – DJ Lethal, Latvian-born rock musician (Limp Bizkit, House of Pain)
December 19 – Alyssa Milano, American activist, advocate, producer, singer and actress
December 22 – Vanessa Paradis, French singer and actress
December 23 - Morgan (singer), Italian musician and singer 
December 25 - Josh Freese, American rock drummer
December 27 – Matt Slocum, American pop guitarist-composer and multi-instrumentalist (Sixpence None the Richer)
December 31 – Joey McIntyre, American singer (New Kids on the Block)

Deaths
January 1 – Maurice Chevalier, 83, French singer and actor
January 16 – David Seville, 52, voice of the Chipmunks
January 19 – Michael Rabin, 35, violinist (fell downstairs)
January 20 – Jean Casadesus, 44, French pianist (car accident)
January 23 – Big Maybelle, 47, singer and pianist
January 24 – Gene Austin, 69, singer-songwriter
January 27 – Mahalia Jackson, 61, gospel singer
January 29 – Margherita Grandi, 77, operatic soprano
February 8 – Markos Vamvakaris, 66, Greek composer
February 11 – Rudi Gfaller, Austrian operetta singer and composer (b. 1882)
February 19 – Lee Morgan, 33, hard bop trumpeter
February 21 – Marie Dubas, 77, French music-hall singer
March 2 – Erna Sack, 74, coloratura soprano (cancer)
March 17 – Linda Jones, 27, soul singer (diabetic coma)
March 27 – Sharkey Bonano, 67, jazz musician and bandleader
April 3 – Ferde Grofé, 80, composer, arranger, and pianist
April 4 – Stefan Wolpe, 69, composer
May 2 – Les Harvey, 27, guitarist (Stone the Crows) (electrocuted on stage)
May 5 – Reverend Gary Davis, 76, blues and gospel singer and guitarist
May 12 – David Hughes, 43, operatic tenor (heart failure)
June 8 – Jimmy Rushing, 70, blues and jazz singer
June 13 – Clyde McPhatter, 39, R&B singer
July 3 – "Mississippi" Fred McDowell, 68, blues musician
July 9 – Robert Weede, 69, operatic baritone
July 10 – Lovie Austin, 84, American pianist, composer, and bandleader 
July 24 – Bobby Ramirez, drummer (Edgar Winter's White Trash)
July 28 – Helen Traubel, 73, operatic soprano
August 2
Brian Cole, 29, bass player in The Association (drug overdose)
Rudolph Ganz, 95, Swiss pianist, conductor and composer
August 14 – Oscar Levant, 65, pianist and composer
August 21 – Yvonne Gall, 87, operatic soprano
August 29 – Lale Andersen, 67, Danish singer
August 31 – Dalva de Oliveira, 55, Brazilian singer (internal bleeding)
September 19 – Robert Casadesus, French pianist and composer, 73
September 24 – Alfred Kalmus, music publisher, 93
September 28 – Rory Storm, 33, English singer (appendicitis)
September 30 – Grigore Cugler, 69,  Romanian riter, artist, composer and violinist
October 3 – Kari Marie Aarvold Glaser, 71, Norwegian pianist and music teacher
October 24 – Thelma Votipka, 67, operatic mezzo-soprano
November 3 – Harry Richman, 77, US singer, actor and composer
November 6 – Billy Murcia, 21, drummer of New York Dolls (suffocation)
November 11 – Berry Oakley, 24, bass player (The Allman Brothers Band) (motorcycle accident)
November 12 – Rudolf Friml, 92, Rose-Marie'' composer
November 18 – Danny Whitten, 29, guitarist (Crazy Horse) (drug overdose)
November 28 – Havergal Brian, 96, English classical composer
December 3 – Bill Johnson, 100, African American Dixieland jazz double-bassist

Awards

Grammy Awards
Grammy Awards of 1972
Grammy Album of the Year: The Concert for Bangladesh
Grammy Best New Artist: America
Grammy Best Album Design: "School's Out" – Alice Cooper
Grammy Best Pop Duo or Group: "Where Is the Love" – Roberta Flack and Donny Hathaway
Grammy Best Pop Female Vocal: "I Am Woman" – Helen Reddy
Grammy Best Pop Male Vocal: "Without You" – Harry Nilsson
Grammy Best R&B Duo or Group: "Papa Was A Rollin' Stone" – The Temptations
Grammy Best R&B Female Vocal: "Young, Gifted And Black" – Aretha Franklin
Grammy Best R&B Male Vocal: "Me And Mrs. Jones" – Billy Paul
Grammy Record of the Year: "The First Time Ever I Saw Your Face" – Roberta Flack
Grammy Song of the Year: "The First Time Ever I Saw Your Face" – Roberta Flack

Country Music Association Awards

Eurovision Song Contest
Eurovision Song Contest 1972

Leeds Piano Competition
Murray Perahia

References

 
20th century in music
Music by year